Alan Woods (born 23 October 1944) is a British Trotskyist political theorist and author. He is one of the leading members of the International Marxist Tendency (IMT) as well as of its British affiliate group Socialist Appeal. He is political editor of the IMT's In Defence of Marxism website. Woods was a leading supporter within the Militant tendency within the Labour Party and its parent group the Committee for a Workers' International until the early 1990s. A series of disagreements on tactics and theory led to Woods and Ted Grant leaving the CWI, to found the Committee for a Marxist International (soon renamed International Marxist Tendency) in 1992. They continued with the policy of entryism into the Labour Party. Woods has expressed particularly vocal support for the Bolivarian Revolution in Venezuela, and repeatedly met with the Venezuelan President Hugo Chávez, leading to speculation that he was a close political adviser to the president.

Early life 
Woods was born into a working-class family in Swansea, South Wales and grew up in the Townhill and Penlan areas of the city. At the age of 16 he joined the Young Socialists and became a Marxist, becoming a supporter of the Trotskyist Militant tendency within the Labour Party. He studied Russian at Sussex University and later in Sofia (Bulgaria) and Moscow State University (MGU). Woods's work in Brighton for the Militant tendency established an important base of support at the university and in the town. He later moved back to south Wales, becoming the first regional full timer for the organisation. He, his wife, and two small daughters moved to Spain in the early 1970s where his well-known political stance placed him amongst those struggling against the Francoist Spain, where he worked to establish the Spanish section of the Committee for a Workers' International (CWI).

Split in Militant

In the early 1990s, Woods and his mentor, Ted Grant, left the Militant tendency and its parent organization, the Committee for a Workers' International, over what they considered to be the ultraleft turn of this organisation when it decided to split from the Labour Party. The minority group, led by Ted Grant, also argued that a decline in emphasis on political education, as well as the development of a bureaucratic clique around Peter Taaffe, was damaging Militant. Grant and Woods and their supporters internationally formed the Committee for a Marxist International in 1992, which was later to be known as the International Marxist Tendency (IMT), and remained active in the Labour Party. The British section of the IMT is known as Socialist Appeal.

Political views

Woods was the editor for some years of the Marxist journal Socialist Appeal, published in London. He is currently a theoretician in the IMT and editor of its website In Defence of Marxism.

Woods has had meetings with Venezuelan President Hugo Chávez, and defends the idea that the Bolivarian Revolution is the germ of the world revolution. Woods also travels and supports other revolutionary processes in Pakistan, Bolivia, the Middle East and Cuba. He is a close friend of Trotsky's grandson Vsievolod Platonovich "Esteban" Volkov, who regards Woods' work as closest to Trotsky's theories. President Chávez publicly stated in a TV broadcast that he was reading Woods' book Reformism or Revolution "in great detail", which encouraged speculation that Woods was an advisor to the President.

In 2010, Woods was subject to severe criticism, firstly by some Venezuelan newspapers and opposition political parties, like Primero Justicia, then by international media outlets, for an article (Where is the Venezuelan revolution going?) he wrote on the IMT website. He wrote it after the latest Venezuelan general elections advocating to further radicalize the Bolivarian Revolution towards "the expropriation of the commanding heights of the economy". His reply to these attacks was given widespread attention in the Venezuelan media.

In November 2012, Woods went on a speaking tour in both the United States and Canada.

In November 2015, Woods detected "embryonic seeds of revolutionary developments" in the election of Jeremy Corbyn as Labour Party leader.

Throughout 2022, Woods wrote a series of articles backing the Russian invasion of Ukraine, in which he blamed the war on western imperialism, while also commenting that the international outrage to the event was mainly driven by the media failing to present the true facts of the events.

Publications 

 Marxism in Our Time (1992)
 China in Crisis (1994)
 A Socialist Alternative to the European Union (1997)
 Revolution in Albania (1997)
 A New Stage in the Capitalist Crisis (1998)
 Indonesia: the Asian Revolution has Begun (1998)
 The Kosovo pogrom and the Balkan Powder-keg (1998)
 Crisis in Russia, the free market failure,
 History of Philosophy,
 Two books co-authored with Ted Grant
 Lenin and Trotsky: what they really stood for (1969)
 Reason in Revolt: Marxist philosophy and modern science (1995)
 Bolshevism: the Road to Revolution (1999).
 Marxism and the National Question (2000)
 British Poets and the French Revolution (2003)
 The revolutionary dialectic of Republicanism – An Open Letter to Irish Republicans (2003).
 In Defence of Marxism – Reply to Israel Shamir (2004)
 The Celia Hart Controversy – Stalinism or Leninism? (2004)
 Ireland: Republicanism and Revolution (2005)
 The Venezuelan Revolution – a Marxist perspective (2005)
 Marxism and the U.S.A. – article (Wellred USA, 2005).
 The Reawakening of the World Working Class and the Tasks Faced by Marxists (2006)
 Reformism or Revolution – Marxism and Socialism of the 21st Century (reply to Heinz Dieterich) (2008)
 XXI Century Socialism, or There is Nothing New Under the Sun November 2010
 Marxism and Anarchism – A collection of writings (2012)
 The First World War: A Marxist Analysis of the Great Slaughter (2019)
 The History of Philosophy: A Marxist Perspective (2021)

References 

1944 births
Alumni of the University of Sussex
British Marxists
British political party founders
British political writers
British social commentators
British Trotskyists
International Marxist Tendency
Living people
Marxist theorists
British Marxist writers
Militant tendency supporters
Moscow State University alumni
People from Swansea
Sofia University alumni
British expatriates in the Soviet Union
Critics of postmodernism